Charles Marsh may refer to:
Charles Marsh (American politician) (1765–1849), American congressman from Vermont
Charles Marsh (barrister) (1774–1835), English MP and lawyer
Charles Marsh (railroad builder) (1825–1876), American railroad builder, instrumental in the transcontinental railroad
Charles Carroll Marsh (1829–after 1863), American Civil War Union colonel
Othniel Charles Marsh (1831–1899), American paleontologist
Charles H. Marsh (1840–1867), American Civil War Union soldier and Medal of Honor recipient
Charles Dwight Marsh (1855–1932), American botanist
Charles E. Marsh (1887–1964), founder of the Public Welfare Foundation
Charles Marsh (1893–1953), American actor who appeared in Cloak and Dagger
Charles F. Marsh (1903–1984), American economist and educator
Charles R. Marsh, American professor of religious studies and 2009 recipient of a Guggenheim Fellowship

See also
Charles Marsh Schomberg (1779–1835), British naval officer and colonial governor
Charlotte "Charlie" Marsh (1887–1961), English suffragette and organiser